Władysław Raczkiewicz (28 January 1885 – 6 June 1947) was a Polish politician, lawyer, diplomat and President of Poland-in-exile from 1939 until his death in 1947. Until 1945, he was the internationally recognized Polish head of state, and the Polish government in exile was recognized as the continuation of the Polish government of 1939.

Early life and studies
Władysław Raczkiewicz was born in Kutaisi, the second-largest city in Georgia, at that time part of the Russian Empire to Polish parents Józef Raczkiewicz, a court judge, and Ludwika Łukaszewicz. He studied in Saint Petersburg where he joined the Polish Youth Organization. After graduating from the Faculty of Law at the University of Dorpat he was employed as a lawyer in Minsk. Upon the outbreak of World War I he served in the Russian Imperial Army, but after the Russian Revolution he joined the vanguard for Polish independence. Serving as the head of the Naczelny Polski Komitet Wojskowy, he helped to create the Polish I Corps in Russia. Later he served under future Marshal and chief-of-state Józef Piłsudski, who created the Polish Legions that ultimately aided Poland in re-establishing its independence.

As a volunteer, he fought in the Polish–Soviet War between 1919 and 1920. At first, he supported the Endecja faction, later joined the Sanacja camp headed by Piłsudski and his closest supporters. Raczkiewicz served as the Voivode of the Nowogródek Voivodeship from 1921 to 1924; government delegate to Wilno Voivodeship (1924–1925) and later as its voivode (1926–1931). After the Brest elections he was appointed the Senate Marshal (1930–1935) and Voivode of Kraków Voivodeship in 1935, and Pomeranian Voivodeship from 1936 to 1939.

World War II
When Poland was invaded by Nazi Germany in 1939, he escaped to Angers, France, where the Polish government-in-exile was established. He lived in the nearby Château de Pignerolle from 2 December 1939 until moving on 10 June 1940 to London, where he joined General Władysław Sikorski and Stanisław Mikołajczyk in the relocated Polish government in exile. He was an opponent of the Sikorski–Mayski agreement.

In February 1945, Joseph Stalin, Winston Churchill and Franklin D. Roosevelt held the Yalta Conference. The future of Poland was one of the main topics that were deliberated upon. Stalin claimed that only a strong, pro-Soviet government in Poland would be able to guarantee the security of the Soviet Union. As a result of the conference, the Allies agreed to withdraw their recognition of the Polish Government in Exile, after the formation of a new government on Polish territory.

Raczkiewicz died in exile in 1947, in the Welsh town of Ruthin. He was buried in the cemetery at Newark-on-Trent in England. In November 2022, the remains of Raczkiewicz, August Zaleski, and Stanisław Ostrowski were reburied at the Mausoleum for emigree presidents at the Temple of Divine Providence in Warsaw.

References

1885 births
1947 deaths
People from Kutaisi
People from Kutais Governorate
politicians from Kutaisi
People from the Russian Empire of Polish descent
National-Democratic Party (Poland) politicians
Nonpartisan Bloc for Cooperation with the Government politicians
Presidents of Poland
Government ministers of Poland
Senat Marshals of the Second Polish Republic
Senators of the Second Polish Republic (1930–1935)
Association of the Polish Youth "Zet" members
Polish anti-communists
Polish exiles
Exiled politicians
Russian military personnel of World War I
Polish people of World War I
Polish people of the Polish–Soviet War
Polish people of World War II
Burials in Nottinghamshire